Robert "Rob" John Tobin (born 20 December 1983 in Lincoln, England) is an English sprinter. He currently has a PB in the 400 m of 45.01 seconds.

Personal life

Tobin was born Robert John Tobin the youngest of two children born to Jacqueline (née Chidlow) and John Tobin.

Career

At the 2006 European Athletics Championships in Gothenburg, he won the silver medal in the 4x400 m relay along with Rhys Williams, Graham Hedman and Timothy Benjamin, in a time of 3 minutes and 1.63 seconds. He won the bronze medal in the 400 m at the 2007 European Athletics Indoor Championships in Birmingham, also in the same championships picking up a gold in the 4x400m.  In 2009 in the World Athletic Championships in Berlin, he was part of the silver medal-winning 4x400 relay team. 2010 saw him picking up two medals a silver in the European Athletics Championships and a bronze at the Commonwealth Games. He has been to three Olympic Games (Athens, Beijing and London). With Beijing bringing back his best performance in an Olympic Games of 3rd in the 4x400, in a time of 2 minutes 58.81 seconds with Andrew Steele, Michael Bingham and Martyn Rooney.

His talent was honed in his youth at the Basingstoke and Mid Hants Athletic Club.

References

 
 Rob Tobin Team GB Profile

1983 births
Living people
English male sprinters
British male sprinters
Olympic male sprinters
Olympic athletes of Great Britain
Olympic bronze medallists for Great Britain
Olympic bronze medalists in athletics (track and field)
Athletes (track and field) at the 2008 Summer Olympics
Medalists at the 2008 Summer Olympics
Commonwealth Games bronze medallists for England
Commonwealth Games medallists in athletics
Athletes (track and field) at the 2006 Commonwealth Games
Athletes (track and field) at the 2010 Commonwealth Games
People from Lincoln, England
World Athletics Championships medalists
European Athletics Championships medalists
European Athletics Indoor Championships winners
British Athletics Championships winners
Medallists at the 2010 Commonwealth Games